The Eurasian Steppe, also simply called the Great Steppe or the steppes, is the vast steppe ecoregion of Eurasia in the temperate grasslands, savannas and shrublands biome. It stretches through Hungary, Bulgaria, Romania, Moldova, Ukraine, western Russia, Siberia, Kazakhstan, Xinjiang, Mongolia and Manchuria, with one major exclave, the Pannonian steppe, located mostly in Hungary.

Since the Paleolithic age, the Steppe Route has connected Central Europe, Eastern Europe, Western Asia, Central Asia, East Asia and South Asia economically, politically and culturally through overland trade routes. The Steppe route is a predecessor not only of the Silk Road which developed during antiquity and the Middle Ages, but also of the Eurasian Land Bridge in the modern era. It has been home to nomadic empires and many large tribal confederations and ancient states throughout history, such as the Xiongnu, Scythia, Cimmeria, Sarmatia, Hunnic Empire, Chorasmia, Transoxiana, Sogdia, Xianbei, Mongol Empire and Göktürk Khaganate.

Geography

Divisions
The Eurasian Steppe extends for 8,000 kilometres (5,000 miles) from near the mouth of the Danube almost to the Pacific Ocean.​ It is bounded on the north by the forests of European Russia, Siberia and Asian Russia. There is no clear southern boundary although the land becomes increasingly dry as one moves south. The steppe narrows at two points, dividing it into three major parts.

Pannonian steppe (exclave) 
The Pannonian steppe is an exclave of the Eurasian Steppe belt. It is found in modern-day Austria, Bulgaria, Hungary, Romania, Serbia and Slovakia.

Pontic–Caspian steppe (Western Steppe) 
The Pontic–Caspian steppe begins near the mouth of the Danube and extends northeast almost to Kazan and then southeast to the southern tip of the Ural Mountains. Its northern edge was a broad band of forest steppe which has now been obliterated by the conversion of the whole area to agricultural land. In the southeast the Black Sea–Caspian Steppe extends between the Black Sea and Caspian Sea to the Caucasus Mountains. In the west, the Great Hungarian Plain is an island of steppe separated from the main steppe by the mountains of Transylvania. On the north shore of the Black Sea, the Crimean Peninsula has some interior steppe and ports on the south coast which link the steppe to the civilizations of the Mediterranean basin.

Ural–Caspian Narrowing 
The Ural Mountains extend south to a point about 650 km (400 mi) northeast of the Caspian Sea.

Kazakh Steppe (Central Steppe) 
The Kazakh Steppe extends from the Urals to Dzungaria. To the south, it grades off into semi-desert and desert which is interrupted by two great rivers, the Amu Darya (Oxus) and Syr Darya (Jaxartes), which flow northwest into the Aral Sea and provide irrigation for agriculture. In the southeast is the densely populated Fergana Valley and west of it the great oasis cities of Tashkent, Samarkand and Bukhara along the Zeravshan River. The southern area has a complex history (see Central Asia and Greater Iran), while in the north, the Kazakh Steppe proper was relatively isolated from the main currents of written history.

Dzungarian Narrowing 
On the east side of the former Sino-Soviet border, mountains extend north almost to the forest zone with only limited grassland in Dzungaria.

The east-west Tian Shan Mountains divide the steppe into Dzungaria in the north and the Tarim Basin to the south. Dzungaria is bounded by the Tarbagatai Mountains on the west and the Mongolian Altai Mountains on the east, neither of which is a significant barrier.  Dzungaria has good grassland around the edges and a central desert. It often behaved as a westward extension of Mongolia and connected Mongolia to the Kazakh Steppe. To the north of Dzungaria are mountains and the Siberian forest. To the south and west of Dzungaria, and separated from it by the Tian Shan mountains, is an area about twice the size of Dzungaria, the oval Tarim Basin. The Tarim Basin is too dry to support even a nomadic population, but around its edges rivers flow down from the mountains giving rise to a ring of cities which lived by irrigation agriculture and east-west trade. The Tarim Basin formed an island of near civilization in the center of the steppe. The Northern Silk Road went along the north and south sides of the Tarim Basin and then crossed the mountains west to the Fergana Valley. At the west end of the basin the Pamir Mountains connect the Tian Shan Mountains to the Himalayas. To the south, the Kunlun Mountains separate the Tarim Basin from the thinly peopled Tibetan Plateau.

Mongolian-Manchurian steppe (Eastern Steppe) 
The Mongol Steppe includes both Mongolia and the Chinese province of Inner Mongolia. The two are separated by a relatively dry area marked by the Gobi Desert. South of the Mongol Steppe is the high and thinly peopled Tibetan Plateau. The northern edge of the plateau is the Gansu or Hexi Corridor, a belt of moderately dense population that connects China proper with the Tarim Basin. The Hexi Corridor was the main route of the Silk Road. In the southeast the Silk Road led over some hills to the east-flowing Wei River valley which led to the North China Plain.

South of the Khingan Mountains and north of the Taihang Mountains, the Mongolian-Manchurian steppe extends east into Manchuria as the Liao Xi steppe. In Manchuria, the steppe grades off into forest and mountains without reaching the Pacific. The central area of forest-steppe was inhabited by pastoral and agricultural peoples, while to the north and east was a thin population of hunting tribes of the Siberian type.

Fauna
Big mammals of the Eurasian steppe were the Przewalski's horse, the saiga antelope, the Mongolian gazelle, the goitered gazelle, the wild Bactrian camel and the onager. The gray wolf and the corsac fox and occasionally the brown bear are predators roaming the steppe. Smaller mammal species are the Mongolian gerbil, the little souslik and the bobak marmot.

Furthermore, the Eurasian steppe is home to a great variety of bird species. Threatened bird species living there are for example the imperial eagle, the lesser kestrel, the great bustard, the pale-back pigeon and the white-throated bushchat.

The primary domesticated animals raised were sheep and goats with fewer cattle than one might expect. Camels were used in the drier areas for transport as far west as Astrakhan. There were some yaks along the edge of Tibet. The horse was used for transportation and warfare. The horse was first domesticated on the Pontic–Caspian or Kazakh steppe sometime before 3000 BC, but it took a long time for mounted archery to develop and the process is not fully understood. The stirrup does not seem to have been completely developed until 300 AD (see Stirrup, Saddle, Composite bow, Domestication of the horse and related articles).

Ecoregions
The World Wide Fund for Nature divides the Eurasian steppe's temperate grasslands, savannas and shrublands into a number of ecoregions, distinguished by elevation, climate, rainfall, and other characteristics and home to distinct animal and plant communities and species and distinct habitat ecosystems.

 Alai–Western Tian Shan steppe (Kazakhstan, Tajikistan, Uzbekistan)
 Altai steppe and semi-desert (Kazakhstan)
 Baraba steppe (Russia)
 Daurian forest steppe (China, Mongolia, Russia)
 Emin Valley steppe (China, Kazakhstan)
 Kazakh forest steppe (Kazakhstan, Russia)
 Kazakh Steppe (Kazakhstan, Russia)
 Kazakh Uplands (Kazakhstan)
 Mongolian-Manchurian grassland (China, Mongolia, Russia)
 Pontic–Caspian steppe (Moldova, Romania, Russia, Ukraine)
 Sayan Intermontane steppe (Russia)
 Selenge–Orkhon forest steppe (Mongolia, Russia)
 South Siberian forest steppe (Russia)
 Tian Shan foothill arid steppe (China, Kazakhstan, Kyrgyzstan)
 Pannonian Steppe (Hungary, Romania, Serbia, Croatia, Slovakia, Austria, Slovenia)

Human activities

Trade habits
The major centers of population and high culture in Eurasia are Europe, the Middle East, India and China. For some purposes it is useful to treat Greater Iran as a separate region. All these regions are connected by the Eurasian Steppe route which was an active predecessor of the Silk Road. The latter started in the Guanzhong region of China and ran west along the Hexi Corridor to the Tarim Basin. From there it went southwest to Greater Iran and turned southeast to India or west to the Middle East and Europe. A minor branch went northwest along the great rivers and north of the Caspian Sea to the Black Sea. When faced with a rich caravan the steppe nomads could either rob it, or tax it, or hire themselves out as guards. Economically these three forms of taxation or parasitism amounted to the same thing. Trade was usually most vigorous when a strong empire controlled the steppe and reduced the number of petty chieftains preying on trade. The silk road first became significant and Chinese silk began reaching the Roman Empire about the time that the Emperor of Han pushed Chinese power west to the Tarim Basin.

Agriculture

The nomads would occasionally tolerate colonies of peasants on the steppe in the few areas where farming was possible. These were often captives who grew grain for their nomadic masters. Along the fringes there were areas that could be used for either plowland or grassland. These alternated between one and the other depending on the relative strength of the nomadic and agrarian heartlands. Over the last few hundred years, the Russian steppe and much of Inner Mongolia has been cultivated. The fact that most of the Russian steppe is not irrigated implies that it was maintained as grasslands as a result of the military strength of the nomads.

Language
According to the most widely held hypothesis of the origin of the Indo-European languages, the Kurgan hypothesis, their common ancestor is thought to have originated on the Pontic-Caspian steppe. The Tocharians were an early Indo-European branch in the Tarim Basin. At the beginning of written history the entire steppe population west of Dzungaria spoke Iranian languages. From about 500 AD the Turkic languages replaced the Iranian languages first on the steppe, and later in the oases north of Iran. Additionally, Hungarian speakers, a branch of the Uralic language family, who previously lived in the steppe in what is now Southern Russia, settled in the Carpathian basin in year 895. Mongolic languages are in Mongolia. In Manchuria one finds Tungusic languages and some others.

Religion
Tengrism was introduced by Turko-Mongol nomads. Nestorianism and Manichaeism spread to the Tarim Basin and into China, but they never became established majority religions. Buddhism spread from the north of India to the Tarim Basin and found a new home in China. By about 1400 AD, the entire steppe west of Dzungaria had adopted Islam. By about 1600 AD, Islam was established in the Tarim Basin while Dzungaria and Mongolia had adopted Tibetan Buddhism.

History

Warfare

 Raids between tribes were prevalent throughout the region's history. This relates to the ease with which a defeated enemy's flocks and herds can be driven away, making raiding profitable. In terms of warfare and raiding, in relation to sedentary societies, the horse gave the nomads an advantage of mobility. Horsemen could raid a village and retreat with their loot before an infantry-based army could be mustered and deployed. When confronted with superior infantry, horsemen could simply ride away, retreat and regroup. Outside of Europe and parts of the Middle East, agrarian societies had difficulty raising a sufficient supply of war horses and often had to enlist cavalry from their nomadic enemies (as mercenaries). Nomads could not easily be pursued onto the steppe since the steppe could not easily support a land army. If the Chinese sent an army into Mongolia, the nomads would flee and come back when the Chinese ran out of supplies. But the steppe nomads were relatively few and their rulers had difficulty holding together enough clans and tribes to field a large army. If steppe nomads conquered an agricultural area they often lacked the skills to administer it. If they tried to hold agrarian land they gradually absorbed the civilization of their subjects, lost their nomadic skills and were either assimilated or driven out.

Relations with neighbors

Along the northern fringe of the Eurasian steppe, nomads would collect tribute from and blend with the forest tribes (see Khanate of Sibir, Buryats). Russia paid tribute (compare yasak) to the Golden Horde
from about 1240 to 1480.
South of the Kazakh steppe the nomads blended with the sedentary population, partly because the Middle East has significant areas of steppe (taken by force in past invasions) and pastoralism. There was a sharp cultural divide between Mongolia and China and almost constant warfare from the dawn of history until the Qing conquest of Dzungaria in 1757. The nomads collected large amounts of tribute from the Chinese and several Chinese dynasties were of steppe origin. Perhaps because of the mixture of agriculture and pastoralism in Manchuria its inhabitants, the Manchu knew how to deal with both nomads and the settled populations and therefore were able to conquer much of northern China when both Chinese and Mongols were weak.

Legacy of the Eurasian steppe's nomads
The steppe culture of Russia was shaped in Russia through cross-cultural contact mostly by Slavic, Tatar-Turkic, Mongolian and Iranian people.  Rus' rulers would ally themselves by marriage with fellow-steppe peoples.
In addition to ethnicity, also instruments such as the domra, traditional costumes such as the kaftan. Russian Cossack and tea culture were strongly influenced by the culture of Asian nomadic peoples. The Eurasian steppes play a major role in Eastern Europe history and the steppes are a subject of many Slavic as well as Russian folk-songs.

Historical peoples and nations

 Thracians 15th-3rd centuries BC
 Chorasmia 13th–3rd centuries BC
 Cimmerians 12th–7th centuries BC
 Magyars 11th century BC – 8th century AD
 Scythians 8th–4th centuries BC
 Sogdiana 8th–4th centuries BC
 Issedones 7th–1st century BC
 Massagetae 7th–1st century BC
 Thyssagetae 7th–3rd century BC
 Donghu 7th – 2nd century BC
 Dahae 7th BC-5th century AD
 Saka 6th–1st centuries BC
 Sarmatians 5th century BC – 5th century AD
 Bulgars 7th century BC–7th century AD
 Transoxiana 4th century BC – 14th century AD
 Xiongnu 3rd century BC – 2nd century AD
 Iazyges 3rd century BC – 5th century AD
 Yuezhi 2nd century BC – 1st century AD
 Tauri
 Wusun 1st century BC – 6th century AD
 Xianbei 1st–3rd centuries
 Goths 3rd–6th centuries
 Vandals 2nd–5th centuries
 Visigoths 3rd–5th centuries
 Franks 3rd–8th centuries
 Huns 4th–8th centuries
 Ostrogoths 4th–8th centuries
 Early Slavs 5th-10th centuries
 Alans 5th–11th centuries
 Avars 5th–9th centuries
 Hepthalites 5th–7th centuries
 Eurasian Avars 6th–8th centuries
 Göktürks 6th–8th centuries
 Sabirs 6th–8th centuries
 Khazars 7th–11th centuries
 Onogurs 8th century
 Pechenegs 8th–11th centuries
 Bashkirs 10th century-present day
 Kipchaks and Cumans 11th–13th centuries
 Crimean Goths
 Mongol Empire 13th–14th centuries
 Chagatai Khanate 13th–15th centuries
 Golden Horde 13th–15th centuries
 Kazakh Khanate 15th–19th centuries
 Cossacks, Kalmyks, Crimean Khanate, Volga Tatars, Nogais and other Turkic states and tribes 15th–18th centuries
 Russian Empire 16th–20th centuries
 Soviet Union 20th century
 Gagauzia, Kazakhstan, Russian Federation, Ukraine, Xinjiang 20th–21st centuries

See also

 Eurasian nomads
 Great Hungarian Plain
 Izyum Trail
 Little Hungarian Plain
 Steppe Route

References

Bibliography
 Barthold, W., Turkestan Down to the Mongol Invasion, T. Minorsky (tr.), New Delhi: Munshiram Manoharlal Publishers, 1992.
 Christian, David, A History of Russia, Central Asia and Mongolia, Volume 1: Inner Eurasia from Prehistory to the Mongol Empire. Malden, MA; Oxford, UK; Carlton, Australia: Blackwell Publishing 1998.
 Fletcher, Joseph F., Studies on Chinese and Islamic Inner Asia, Beatrice Forbes Manz (ed.), Aldershot, Hampshire: Variorum, 1995, IX.
 Grousset, René, The Empire of the Steppes: A History of Central Asia, Naomi Walford (tr.), New Brunswick, NJ: Rutgers University Press, 1970.
 John of Plano Carpini, "History of the Mongols," in Christopher Dawson (ed.), Mission to Asia, Toronto: University of Toronto Press, 2005, pp. 3–76.
 Krader, Lawrence, "Ecology of Central Asian Pastoralism," Southwestern Journal of Anthropology, Vol. 11, No. 4 (1955), pp. 301–326.
 Lattimore, Owen, "The Geographical Factor in Mongol History," in Owen Lattimore (ed.), Studies in Frontier History: Collected Papers 1928–1958, London: Oxford University Press, 1962, pp. 241–258.
 Sinor, Denis, "The Inner Asian Warrior," in Denis Sinor (Collected Studies Series), Studies in Medieval Inner Asia, Aldershot, Hampshire: Ashgate, Variorum, 1997, XIII.
 Sinor, Denis, "Horse and Pasture in Inner Asian History," in Denis Sinor (Collected Studies Series), Inner Asia and its Contacts with Medieval Europe, London: Variorum, 1977, II.

External links

 "The importance of the Eurasian steppe to the study of international relations" in Journal of International Relations and Development

 
Central Asia
East Asia
Eastern Europe
Ecoregions of Asia
Ecoregions of Europe
Eurasia
Geography of Central Asia
Geography of East Asia
Geography of Eastern Europe
Geography of Siberia
Grasslands of Asia
Grasslands of Europe
Grasslands of Russia
History of Pakistan
Social history of India
Southern Europe
Temperate grasslands, savannas, and shrublands
Western Europe